María de la Paz Elizabeth Sofía Adriana de la Huerta y Bruce (born September 3, 1984), known professionally as Paz de la Huerta, is an American actress and model. She had roles in the films The Cider House Rules (1999) and A Walk to Remember (2002), and played Lucy Danziger in the HBO drama series Boardwalk Empire.

Early life
De la Huerta was raised by her mother, with her older sister, in the New York City neighborhood of SoHo, located in Lower Manhattan. Her parents are Spanish nobleman Íñigo de la Huerta y Ozores, 14th Duke of Mandas, Grandee of Spain and Judith Bruce. De la Huerta was born with recurrent cystic hygroma under her arm, which she has had treated with multiple surgeries. Her mother worked as an authority on birth control and women's issues in Third World countries.

She attended private Saint Ann's School in the New York City borough of Brooklyn, with fellow student and future fashion designer, Zac Posen, for whom she has since modeled. She also attended the performing arts camp Buck's Rock. De la Huerta spent summers with her father in Spain while attending high school.

Career
De la Huerta began modeling in her adolescence and became a runway model before transitioning into film. She made her film debut with a small role in the 1998 romantic comedy The Object of My Affection, and the next year appeared opposite Michael Caine and Charlize Theron in The Cider House Rules. In 2002, she appeared opposite Shane West and Mandy Moore in A Walk to Remember, an American coming-of-age romantic drama film based on the Nicholas Sparks novel.

In 2007, de la Huerta was cast in the role of Linda for the film Enter the Void, a psychedelic melodrama set in neon-lit nightclub environments of Tokyo. Director Gaspar Noé found her after holding auditions in New York City. "I met Paz and I really liked her. She had the profile for the character because she likes screaming, crying, showing herself naked—all the qualities for it."

In 2009, de la Huerta was cast in the HBO pilot Boardwalk Empire, set in Atlantic City during the Prohibition era, as Enoch "Nucky" Thompson's mistress, a former Ziegfeld Follies dancer.
Boardwalk Empire was renewed for a second season, with de la Huerta returning as Lucy. Discussing the second season she said; "The first season was very different from the second season. With the first season, nobody really knew how the show was going to be received. With the second season, we had gotten lots of accolades and great reviews, so it was work, work, work, where we were shooting two episodes at a time."
After the second season ended, de la Huerta and fellow co-stars Michael Pitt, Aleksa Palladino, and Dabney Coleman all departed the cast. In 2012, she commented on her departure from the series, stating she wanted to put her focus on other things.
In 2013, she commented on how she would like to return to the hit series. "I’m still close with the producers. Terry (Terence Winter) always says it's possible for me to come back." Also adding; "I would love to come back with Lucy as a loving, doting mother."

In 2011, Lana Del Rey, an American singer, received widespread attention when the music video for her single "Video Games" became a viral internet sensation. The video—directed and edited by Del Rey—included paparazzi footage of de la Huerta falling down while intoxicated. When asked if she was upset about the video, de la Huerta stated, "No, no. I don't get hung up about anything really. That's insignificant. I didn't really care."

In April 2011, she was sued by MTV reality show actress Samantha Swetra after an altercation at a bar. De la Huerta was arrested, issued a desk appearance ticket, and released. In July 2011, she pleaded guilty to harassment and, in exchange, misdemeanor charges against her were reduced to a non-criminal violation. A judge ordered her to complete 12 weeks of alcohol counseling, one day of community service, and to stay away from Swetra.

In July 2011, de la Huerta signed on to play Abby Russell, the protagonist in the horror film Nurse 3D. A sequel for Nurse had been rumored by de la Huerta on her Twitter page with her stating that Nurse 2 would start shooting soon. However, In 2015, it was reported that de la Huerta was suing the filmmakers, for ruining her career and injuring her when a speeding ambulance driven by a stunt driver struck her while shooting.

She was the cover model in Playboy in 2013.

In 2014, she completed filming in Las Vegas for the movie Death in the Desert, cast as Margo and co-starring with Michael Madsen and Shayla Beesley. She also had a supporting role in the Canadian horror film The Editor. She later appeared in Louis Theroux's 2015 documentary My Scientology Movie when she "crashed" an interview.

The next year, de la Huerta played Pepper in the drama film Bare, opposite Dianna Agron. The film follows a young woman living in a small desert town in Nevada, who becomes romantically involved with a female drifter who leads her into a life of drugs, stripping, and psychedelic spiritual experiences. 
Director Natalia Leite wanted to cast two women who were willing to be totally raw and exposed on camera in the leading roles. She stated: "I wanted to find two women who were very different from each other to put those two contrasting energies together." The film had a world premiere at the Tribeca Film Festival on April 19, 2015. Frank Scheck of The Hollywood Reporter wrote that de la Huerta was perfectly cast for her role as Pepper, though the film has a "mundane storyline." John Stewart of The Slanted wrote, "The film is an wonderful departure for Glee’s Dianna Agron and her performance with Paz de la Huerta is sure to spark a lot more work in the future for both rising stars."

Me Too movement
De la Huerta, at the height of the Me Too movement, said in an interview with Vanity Fair that movie mogul Harvey Weinstein raped her on two occasions in 2010, once after demanding to enter her apartment and have a drink, and once showing up after she  had been subjected to repeated phone calls and had been drinking. De la Huerta came forward to police in 2017, within the New York state statute of limitations for rape in the first degree, and the New York District Attorney's Office was considering bringing charges against Weinstein. While charges have yet to be filed in de la Huerta's case, Weinstein has been charged in New York with the rape of another woman. More than 75 women have accused Weinstein of sexual abuse; he has denied all allegations.

In November 2018, de la Huerta filed a $60 million lawsuit in Los Angeles Superior Court accusing Weinstein of raping her in 2010 and then embarking on a campaign of harassment that she contends damaged her career.

Personal life
De la Huerta lived in New York City in an apartment on Gay Street, and then moved into an apartment adjacent to her mother in the Tribeca neighborhood. She has a cobra tattooed on one leg and a crown on an arm, the latter as a tribute to her lineage.

Filmography

Films

Television

Music videos

References

External links

 
 Paz de la Huerta: Behind the Nude, article at Focus Features' website
 Are You Ready for Paz?, article at New York magazine's website
 Interview with Paz de la Huerta by Imagine Fashion

1984 births
Living people
20th-century American actresses
21st-century American actresses
Actresses from New York City
American child actresses
Female models from New York (state)
American film actresses
American people of Basque descent
American television actresses
People from Tribeca
People from Greenwich Village
Saint Ann's School (Brooklyn) alumni